Volkel (Brabantian: Vollekul) is a village in the Netherlands. It is situated in the north-east corner of the province of North Brabant, south-east of the town of Uden. On 1 January 2021, Volkel had 3,435 inhabitants. It used to be part of the municipality of Uden, and merged into the municipality of Maashorst in 2022.

Volkel is known for Volkel Air Base and amusement park .

Volkel used to be a little village. In 1455, a chapel was built, but did not get a church until 1855. In 1940, a military airport was built near Volkel by the Germans. During Operation Market Garden, the airport was bombed many times. The damage was repaired afterwards, and it first served as an Allied airport and later it became a Dutch military airport.

Gallery

Climate

References 

Populated places in North Brabant
Geography of Maashorst